Streptomyces altiplanensis is an alkalitolerant bacterium species from the genus of Streptomyces which has been isolated from soil from Salar del Huasco in the Atacama Desert.

See also 
 List of Streptomyces species

References 

altiplanensis
Bacteria described in 2019